Singleton Council is a local government area in the Hunter Region of New South Wales, Australia. It is situated adjacent to the New England Highway and the Main North railway line.

The mayor of the council is Cr. Sue Moore, an independent politician.

Singleton Shire was established on 1 January 1976 with the amalgamation of Patrick Plains Shire and the Municipality of Singleton.

History

Aboriginal history 
Singleton and the surrounding area was originally occupied by The Wonnarua / Wanaruah people and they are the traditional land owners of the Singleton area.

Early history 
The town is named after Ben Singleton who explored the area in 1820s . In 1821 he started to occupy the land. In 1823 he started an agistment business on the Hunter River and started a flour mill in 1827.In 1829 the town expanded to a post office and an inn.

Main towns and villages 

The Council area includes Singleton, Broke, Bulga, Howes Valley, Putty, Warkworth, Jerrys Plains, Camberwell, Ravensworth, Mount Olive, Carrowbrook, Mirranie, Elderslie, Belford and Branxton.

Demographics
At the 2011 census, there were  people in the Singleton Council local government area, of these 51.3 per cent were male and 48.7 per cent were female. Aboriginal and Torres Strait Islander people made up 3.7 per cent of the population, which was higher than the national and state averages of 2.5 per cent. The median age of people in the Singleton Council area was 35 years, which was slightly lower than the national median of 37 years. Children aged 0 – 14 years made up 22.2 per cent of the population and people aged 65 years and over made up 10.4 per cent of the population. Of people in the area aged 15 years and over, 51.5 per cent were married and 10.5 per cent were either divorced or separated.

When compared with total population growth of Australia for the same periods, being 5.78 per cent and 8.32 per cent respectively, population growth in the Singleton Council local government area was slightly lower than the national average. The median weekly income for residents within the Singleton Council area was marginally higher than the national average.

At the 2011 census, the proportion of residents in the Singleton Council local government area who stated their ancestry as Australian or Anglo-Celtic exceeded 83 per cent of all residents (national average was 65.2 per cent). In excess of 69% of all residents in the Singleton Council area nominated a religious affiliation with Christianity at the 2011 census, which was significantly higher than the national average of 50.2 per cent. Meanwhile, as at the census date, compared to the national average, households in the Singleton Council local government area had a significantly lower than average proportion (4.0 per cent) where two or more languages are spoken (national average was 20.4 per cent); and a significantly higher proportion (93.5 per cent) where English only was spoken at home (national average was 76.8 per cent).

Council

Current composition and election method 
Singleton Council is composed of ten councillors, including the mayor, for a fixed four-year term of office. The mayor is directly elected while the nine other councillors are elected proportionally as one entire ward. The most recent election was held on 4 December 2021, and the makeup of the council, including the mayor, is as follows:

The current Council, elected in 2021, in order of election by ward, is:

References 

 
1976 establishments in Australia